Acanthocera is a genus of flies belonging to the family Tabanidae.

The species of this genus are found in South America.

Species
Acanthocera anacantha Lutz & Neiva, 1915
Acanthocera aureoscutellata Henriques & Rafael, 1992
Acanthocera bequaerti (Fairchild, 1964)
Acanthocera bicincta Henriques & Rafael, 1992
Acanthocera coarctata (Wiedemann, 1828)
Acanthocera distincta Henriques & Rafael, 1995
Acanthocera exstincta (Wiedemann, 1828)
Acanthocera fairchildi Henriques & Rafael, 1992
Acanthocera gorayebi Henriques & Rafael, 1992
Acanthocera inopinatus (Fairchild, 1972)
Acanthocera intermedia Lutz, 1915
Acanthocera kroberi Fairchild, 1939
Acanthocera longicornis (Fabricius, 1775)
Acanthocera lutzi (Enderlein, 1922)
Acanthocera marginalis Walker, 1854
Acanthocera polistiformis Fairchild, 1961
Acanthocera quinquecincta Lutz, 1915
Acanthocera vespiformis Burger, 2002

References

Tabanidae
Taxa named by Pierre-Justin-Marie Macquart
Diptera of South America
Brachycera genera